Jeremie Berrebi (born 4 June 1978) is a French-Israeli entrepreneur and businessman.

Biography
Jeremie Berrebi was the editor for ZDNet French in 1996 a French technology news agency.
In 1997 he co-founded Google news ancestor Net2one one of the first French internet news provider, later in 2004 Net2one sold to TNS Group (UK).

In March 2010 Berrebi co-founded with Xavier Niel Kima Ventures, a fund dedicated organization to invest in 50 to 100 startups a year everywhere in the world.
Jeremie is now co-founder and Advisory Board Member of the Israeli-based coding bootcamp Developers.Institute.

Berrebi is active in the investment, private equity & technology industries with more than 360 investments.

In May 2015, Berrebi announced his departure from Kima Ventures, the launch of Magical Capital, advising family offices and corporates on their investments, acquisitions and digital transformation and joined the LetterOne Technology advisory board that he left in April 2017.

Awards and recognition
Jeremie won the Europas Prize of Best European Angel Investor in 2014.

Public positions
Developers Institute Tel Aviv Coding Bootcamp – Ranked as 2nd best coding bootcamp in English – Co-Founder and Strategic Advisory Board Member
Magical Capital Founder & CEO
 Former LetterOne Technology Advisory Board member
 Former co-founder at Kima Ventures.
 Founder of KoolAgency, A team of passionate Mobile and Web experts.
 Former chairman of Zlio
 Business advisor and co-founder of Teliswitch, an Automated optical distribution frame (AODF) family
 Business advisor and co-founder of Leetchi, a group gifts and events, online money pots (sold to Credit Mutuel Arkea)
 Business advisor and co-founder of FreshPlanet,  a social, casual gaming company developing online games for the iPad and Facebook.
 Business advisor and co-founder of iAdvize, Real-time online customer service: live chat.
 Business advisor and co-founderof EverContact, an online Contact Management system
 Co-founder of OneTask
 Co-founder of Kwaga 
 Co-founder of 8-Sec
 Co-founder of Producteev, a Task Management Software (sold to Jive Software).
 Former CEO of Net2one  (Sold to TNS in 2004)
 Former editor of ZDNet.fr
 Former CompuServe SysOp
 Co-founder and advisory board member of the Israeli-based coding bootcamp Developers.Institute.

References

Further reading

External links
 

1978 births
Living people
Israeli businesspeople